William Branthwaite (1563–1619) was an English scholar and translator.

The son of John Branthwaite, William Branthwaite was baptised at St Peter Mancroft, Norwich on 13 June 1563.

Branthwaite entered Clare Hall, Cambridge in 1579, graduating B.A. in 1582–3, M.A. in 1586 (from Emmanuel College, incorporated M.A. at Oxford in 1594), B.D. in 1593, D.D. in 1598. He was a Fellow of the newly founded Emmanuel College 1585–1607, under Laurence Chaderton. In 1607 he was appointed Master of Gonville and Caius College by royal mandate.  He was the first of eighteen members of his family at Caius. Having an extensive knowledge of Hebrew, he served in the "Second Cambridge Company" charged by King James with translating the Apocrypha for the King James Version of the Bible. He died, whilst Vice-Chancellor, in January 1619.

References

 Nicolson, Adam. (2003) God's Secretaries: The Making of the King James Bible. New York: HarperCollins 

1563 births
1619 deaths
Alumni of Clare College, Cambridge
Fellows of Emmanuel College, Cambridge
Masters of Gonville and Caius College, Cambridge
Vice-Chancellors of the University of Cambridge
Translators of the King James Version
English translators